The Little White Horse is a low fantasy children's novel by Elizabeth Goudge, first published by the University of London Press in 1946 with illustrations by C. Walter Hodges, and Anne Yvonne Gilbert in 1992. Coward–McCann published a US edition next year. Set in 1842, it features a recently orphaned teenage girl who is sent to the manor house of her cousin and guardian in the West Country of England. The estate, village, and vicinity are shrouded in mystery and magic; the "little white horse" is a unicorn.

Goudge won the annual Carnegie Medal from the Library Association, recognising the year's best children's book by a British subject. It has been adapted for film and television.

WorldCat participating libraries report holding editions in 11 languages of translation.

Plot summary

Maria Merryweather becomes an orphan at age 13 on her father's death in 1842. She is sent to Moonacre Manor in the West side, accompanied by her governess Miss Heliotrope and dog Wiggins. There she finds herself in a world out of time. Her cousin and guardian Sir Benjamin Merryweather is one of the "sun" Merryweathers, and she loves him right away, as "sun" and "moon" Merryweathers do. Maria discovers that there is an ancient mystery about the founding of the estate.

She is aided by wonderful people and magical beasts, but it is by self-sacrifice and perseverance, too, that Maria is able to save Moonacre, right the wrongs, reunite lost loves and finally bring peace to the valley.

Characters 
 Maria Merryweather – A smart, 13-year-old orphan with red hair and freckles. She rescues a hare in the forest, names it Serena, and keeps it as her pet.
 Miss Jane Heliotrope – Maria's governess. She is old-fashioned and very tall, with forget-me-not-blue eyes.
 Sir Benjamin Merryweather – Maria's cousin and guardian.
 Marmaduke Scarlet – Sir Benjamin's cook and housekeeper. Also the owner of Zachariah the cat. He does not like feminine curiosity and sees his kitchen as a private domain. He is a wonderful chef.
 Digweed – Sir Benjamin's coachman and gardener.
 Loveday Minette – Sir Benjamin's ex-fiancée. She is known in the book to have a passion for pink geraniums. When their argument broke out about the geraniums, she left Moonacre and got married in town to a lawyer.
 Robin – The son of Loveday Minette.
 Old Parson – The parson who helps Maria give Paradise Hill back to God. His real name is Louis de Fontenelle and he was Miss Heliotrope's childhood sweetheart.
 Monsieur Coque de Noir – the black-hearted owner of the castle in the pine wood and leader of a wicked band.

The animals
 Zachariah – Marmaduke's special cat. He helps out Maria and Robin. He writes messages in the ashes in the kitchen fireplace.
 Wrolf (pronounced Rolf) – A lion who acts as Maria's special protector, called a dog by Sir Benjamin and others.
 Serena – A hare that Maria saved from hunters.
 Wiggins – Maria's greedy King Charles Spaniel.
 Periwinkle – Maria's grey pony whose other name is Joy-of-the-Ground.

Adaptations 

The 1994 television mini-series Moonacre was loosely based on The Little White Horse.

In 2008, the book was very loosely adapted into the film The Secret of Moonacre, written by Lucy Shuttleworth and Graham Alborough and directed by Gabor Csupo. Starring Dakota Blue Richards as Maria, the movie was mostly shot in Hungary and released in February 2009

J. K. Rowling, the author of Harry Potter, mentioned that The Little White Horse was her favourite childhood book.

References

Citations
 Archived official web site for the movie.
 The Secret of Moonacre at the Internet Movie Database
 Elizabeth Goudge Society page and reader forum

External links
 
  —immediately, first US edition 
 

British children's novels
Children's fantasy novels
Books illustrated by Anne Yvonne Gilbert
Carnegie Medal in Literature winning works
Fiction about unicorns
Novels about orphans
Novels set in the 1840s
Novels set in England
Fiction set in 1842
1946 British novels
Books published by university presses
British novels adapted into films
British novels adapted into television shows
Low fantasy novels
1946 children's books